The NEXUS reusable rocket was a concept design created in the 1960s by a group at General Dynamics led by Krafft Arnold Ehricke. It was intended as the next leap beyond the Saturn V, carrying up to eight times more payload. Several versions were designed, including 12,000 and 24,000 short ton vehicles with payloads of one thousand and two thousand short tons respectively. The larger version had a diameter of 202 feet (61.5 metres). It was never built. 

It was a single-stage-to-orbit vehicle that would be fully recoverable upon landing in the ocean.
It would use parachutes to slow descent, with retrorockets (on top) for a final soft touchdown.

Notes

External links
SP-4221 The Space Shuttle Decision - Chapter 2 refs "Astronautics, January 1963, pp. 50-56." re Nexus
Encyclopedia Astronautica - Nexus
diagrams of NEXUS versions

Space launch vehicles of the United States
Hypothetical spacecraft
Cancelled space launch vehicles
Nexus